Luigi Luxardo (27 April 1914 – 2 November 2006) was an Italian rower. He competed in the men's coxless four at the 1936 Summer Olympics.

References

External links
 

1914 births
2006 deaths
Italian male rowers
Olympic rowers of Italy
Rowers at the 1936 Summer Olympics
Sportspeople from Genoa